Laila Jane Harré (born 8 January 1966) is a New Zealand politician and trade unionist. She was the first leader of the Internet Party, and stood for Parliament in the 2014 general election through the Helensville electorate. From 1996 to 2002, she was a Member of Parliament for the Alliance party, briefly leading that party after the group experienced a schism in 2002.

Early life
Harré's father was a social anthropologist, and the family spent a part of her childhood (including some years of primary school) living in Fiji while he studied urbanisation there. Her mother was an actress. After returning to New Zealand, she attended secondary school in Auckland at Auckland Girls' Grammar, before gaining Bachelor of Arts and Bachelor of Laws degrees at the University of Auckland. At university she won the senior prizes for political studies and law and became an anti-nuclear activist.

Professional life
After finishing her degree she spent 10 weeks on the Nicaraguan-Honduran border with the "Harry Holland Coffee Picking Brigade" before spending a year working at the United Nations on disarmament issues and as a representative of the Women's International League for Peace and Freedom. She then worked for some time as a lawyer specialising in industrial relations and employment law, and developing close links to the trade-union movement.

1982–1996: Labour, NewLabour, and the Alliance
Harré joined the Labour Party in 1982, representing the youth wing on the party's New Zealand Council. She worked in the Beehive as an advisor to disarmament minister Fran Wilde. Throughout her seven-year membership of the party she was a critic of the policies advanced by Roger Douglas, who became Minister of Finance when Labour won the 1984 election. Douglas, an advocate of free-market economics, introduced a programme of radical reforms (often collectively labeled Rogernomics) which alienated many of Labour's traditional supporters, including Harré.

In 1989, Harré resigned from the Labour Party. She became a founding member of the NewLabour Party, an organisation started by dissident Labour MP Jim Anderton. NewLabour later joined with several other parties to form the Alliance. She stood for the Alliance nomination to contest the Tamaki by-election in 1992, but was unsuccessful. At the 1992 local-body elections she stood as a candidate for the newly created Auckland Regional Services Trust on the Alliance ticket. Harré was not elected, but polled the highest of unsuccessful candidates. The next year she stood as the Alliance candidate for the Te Atatū electorate in the 1993 election, but was again unsuccessful, coming runner-up to Labour's Chris Carter.

1996–2002: Member of Parliament

In the 1996 election, which took place under the new MMP electoral system, the Alliance ranked Harré in eighth place on its party list. The Alliance gained a sufficient number of votes for Harré to enter parliament.

After the 1999 election, the Alliance formed a coalition government with Labour (which had by then backed away from many of the policies introduced by Douglas). Harré became Minister for Women's Affairs and Minister of Youth Affairs and Associate Minister of Labour and Commerce. She later gained additional responsibilities as Minister of Statistics.

She led the parliamentary campaign for the introduction of paid parental leave from Opposition and as a Minister sponsored the legislation to introduce 12 weeks paid parental leave in 2002. Other causes championed by Harré included legislation protecting the interests of building industry sub-contractors, significant minimum-wage increases and the reduction of age discrimination in the minimum wage. She re-launched the pay-equity debate as Minister of Women's Affairs, and a campaign to increase annual leave from three weeks to four weeks.

In late 2001, however, the Alliance began to show signs of internal strain. In particular, some members of the party felt that it was losing its independent political identity and failing to differentiate itself from the Labour Party on issues such as free trade, tertiary-education funding and other core areas. The decision of Jim Anderton and a majority of Alliance MPs to back New Zealand's involvement in the US-led invasion of Afghanistan brought these tensions to a head, dividing the caucus and separating the parliamentary leadership from the majority in the non-parliamentary party organisation (led by Matt McCarten). Harré, however, aligned herself with the grass-roots party view, and became its de facto leader in parliament.

The collapse of the Alliance soon became inevitable, with Anderton and his supporters deciding to contest the 2002 election as a new party (the Progressives). Harré, considered to be the foremost of the MPs who remained behind, was chosen to lead what remained of the Alliance into its election campaign, aiming to at least retain a presence in parliament. Harré herself was seen as the party's best chance of keeping a parliamentary seat, having a relatively strong chance of winning the seat of Waitakere. In the election itself, however, Harré placed second, being defeated by Labour's Lynne Pillay.

The following year, Harré stepped down as leader of the Alliance, being replaced by Matt McCarten. Harré was still active in the Alliance afterwards and was elected to the party executive at its annual conference in 2003. At the 2004 party conference she chose not to re-contest a position within the Alliance stating that from then on the most pragmatic approach for the Alliance would be to instead support the Greens and Maori Party. She was not aligned to any other political party from 2004–2011, but in 2012 accepted a role as issues director of the Green Party.

2002–2014: Outside parliamentary politics

From 2002 to 2005, Harré led the industrial work of the New Zealand Nurses Organisation, including its successful pay-equity campaign for public-sector nurses. She served as General Secretary of the National Distribution Union from 2005 to 2009, after which she joined the Auckland Transition Agency.

Between 2010 and 2012 Harré worked for the International Labour Organization in Fiji. Subsequently, in 2012 she started work as the inaugural issues director of the Green Party, a position she resigned from in 2013. Harré quit the Green Party in protest to the way that the Greens had handled a rebuffed proposition by the Labour Party for conducting a joint electoral campaign.

Harré co-owns an Auckland restaurant, Ika, which pays a living wage to its staff.

2014: Internet Party leadership 
On 29 May 2014, Harré was named as the first leader of New Zealand's Internet Party. Vikram Kumar, chief executive of the Internet Party, initially approached her in early 2014 about becoming the party's leader, but Harré declined. Kumar encouraged her to meet with Kim Dotcom, a meeting which led to Harré taking the project seriously, and subsequently accepting the offer. On announcing the decision, she stated that she got involved again in politics because she wanted to encourage young people to vote, and to re-connect disenfranchised people with the political system. The party allied with the Mana Party to contest the 2014 election as the Internet MANA Party. Harré had second place on the combined party's list.

Following the failure of Internet MANA to enter Parliament, Harré stood back from media view for several weeks before formally announcing she was stepping down as leader of the Internet Party, effective December 2014.

Since the election, Harré has been occasionally writing on New Zealand left-wing blog site The Daily Blog, and undertook a "pilgrimage" across New Zealand called Rethinking the System. In December 2016, Harré announced she had rejoined the Labour Party 27 years after she left to join NewLabour.

Personal life
Harré lives in Te Atatū Peninsula and is married to Barry Gribben. They met through the Labour Party and share an interest in an organic vineyard, a restaurant, and several properties. She also has two children.

Harré was diagnosed with breast cancer, and, because she has a family history of the disease, opted for a double mastectomy and breast reconstruction. She made a full recovery in 2012.

Harré has run several marathons, including the 2013 Boston Marathon, where she was only a few hundred metres away from the terrorist bombing that occurred near the finish line.

Laila Harré is a niece of philosopher and psychologist Rom Harré and the sister of psychologist and environmentalist Niki Harré.

References

External links

Laila Harré on LinkedIn

1966 births
Living people
Alliance (New Zealand political party) MPs
Internet Party (New Zealand) politicians
Members of the Cabinet of New Zealand
NewLabour Party (New Zealand) politicians
New Zealand Labour Party politicians
New Zealand left-wing activists
New Zealand list MPs
Leaders of political parties in New Zealand
New Zealand trade unionists
Women government ministers of New Zealand
Unsuccessful candidates in the 1993 New Zealand general election
Unsuccessful candidates in the 2002 New Zealand general election
Unsuccessful candidates in the 2014 New Zealand general election
Members of the New Zealand House of Representatives
21st-century New Zealand politicians
21st-century New Zealand women politicians
Women members of the New Zealand House of Representatives
People educated at Auckland Girls' Grammar School
Women's International League for Peace and Freedom people